Bryant Colby Young (born January 27, 1972) is an American former professional football player who was a defensive tackle for the San Francisco 49ers of the National Football League (NFL). A first-round draft pick out of University of Notre Dame, Young was nominated for the 2019 class of the Pro Football Hall of Fame, eventually being elected in 2022.

College years
Young was a three-year starter at Notre Dame, lettering all four years from 1990 to 1993. As a senior, he was an All-American selection, and had 6.5 sacks and 67 tackles. As a junior, he was an Honorable Mention All-American selection and garnered 7.5 sacks. He graduated from Notre Dame in 1994 with a major in marketing.

Professional career

He was drafted by the 49ers in the first round (seventh overall) in the 1994 NFL Draft. Young made Honorable Mention All-Pro by The Associated Press in 1995. Young had his finest statistical season in 1996 recording 84 tackles, 11.5 sacks, and two safeties, while earning his first trip to the Pro Bowl. In 1997, although Young's sack total dropped to just four on the season, he was still a dominant presence on the interior line, helping San Francisco finish first overall in the NFL in total defense that season. Despite his drop in statistical production, he was still widely considered by many to be the best all-around DT in the NFL, despite teammate DT Dana Stubblefield being named the NFL Defensive Player of the Year that same season. Young was leading the entire NFL at the DT position in sacks with 9.5 prior to his season-ending injury suffered on a Monday Night match-up against the New York Giants in week 13 of the 1998 season. The injury to Young's leg was so severe that he needed a metal rod to be inserted in the broken leg. Despite Young's devastating injury coming late in the 1998 season, he came back fully recovered in time for the 1999 season and recorded over 70 tackles, 11 sacks and a safety which earned him his second Pro Bowl. Young also received the NFL Comeback Player of the Year Award for his fantastic play that same season. Bryant Young had 89.5 career sacks in his 14-year career with the 49ers, ranking him at 6th all-time in the NFL in career sacks for a player at the DT position, trailing only Trevor Pryce, Steve McMichael, Henry Thomas, Aaron Donald, and Hall of Famers John Randle and Warren Sapp. He also ranks third on the team's all-time career sacks list placing him behind only DE Tommy Hart and DE Cedric Hardman. Bryant Young also owns the 49ers' franchise record for career safeties, with 3. Young retired after the 2007 season, with the distinction of being the last active member of the Super Bowl team.

Young is a member of the NFL's All-Decade Team of the 1990s. Young became eligible for the Pro Football Hall of Fame in 2013. Young advanced to the semi-finalist stage in Hall of Fame voting in 2020. He was eventually elected to the Hall in 2022.

He is also an 8-time recipient of the 49ers' annual Len Eshmont award, which is the team's most prestigious award and is given to the Niners player who best exemplifies the "inspirational and courageous play" of its namesake. No other recipient has won the award at least thrice.

NFL career statistics

Coaching career
On January 21, 2010, Young was hired as the defensive line coach at San Jose State University.

On January 14, 2011, Young was hired as the defensive line coach at the University of Florida.

He later re-joined defensive coordinator Dan Quinn, his former position coach with the 49ers, when he was hired as the defensive line coach for the Atlanta Falcons on February 8, 2017. He spent two seasons (2017–18) in that capacity before he resigned to spend more time with his family.

Personal life
Young is a Christian. Young is married to Kristin M. Young. They have six children.

References

External links
 Atlanta Falcons bio

1972 births
Living people
American football defensive ends
American football defensive tackles
Atlanta Falcons coaches
Florida Gators football coaches
Notre Dame Fighting Irish football coaches
Notre Dame Fighting Irish football players
San Francisco 49ers players
San Jose State Spartans football coaches
Ed Block Courage Award recipients
National Conference Pro Bowl players
Pro Football Hall of Fame inductees
People from Chicago Heights, Illinois
Sportspeople from Cook County, Illinois
Coaches of American football from Illinois
Players of American football from Illinois
African-American coaches of American football
African-American players of American football
20th-century African-American sportspeople
21st-century African-American sportspeople